The 2019 Georgetown Hoyas men's soccer team represented the Georgetown University during the 2019 NCAA Division I men's soccer season and the 2019 Big East Conference men's soccer season. The regular season began on August 30 and concluded on November 6. It was the program's 68th season fielding a men's varsity soccer team, and their 24th season in the Big East Conference. The 2019 season was Brian Wiese's 14th year as head coach for the program. The Hoyas concluded their season with their first national championship in program history, defeating top-seeded Virginia in the NCAA Tournament.

Background

Player movement

Squad

Roster

Team management

Schedule 

|-
!colspan=6 style=""| Non-conference regular season
|-

|-
!colspan=6 style=""| Big East Conference regular season
|-

|-
!colspan=6 style=""| Big East Conference Tournament
|-

|-
!colspan=6 style=""| NCAA Tournament
|-

|-

References

External links 
 Georgetown Men's Soccer

2019
Georgetown Hoyas
Georgetown Hoyas
Georgetown Hoyas men's soccer
Georgetown Hoyas
2019 Georgetown Hoyas
2019 Georgetown Hoyas